Ethonion is a genus of beetles in the family Buprestidae, containing the following species:

 Ethonion breve (Carter, 1923)
 Ethonion corpulentum (Boheman, 1858)
 Ethonion fissiceps (Kirby, 1818)
 Ethonion jessicae (Hawkeswood & Turner, 1994)
 Ethonion leai (Carter, 1924)
 Ethonion maculatum (Blackburn, 1887)
 Ethonion reichei (Chevrolat, 1838)
 Ethonion roei (Saunders, 1868)

References

Buprestidae genera